The Gounda mouse (Mus goundae) is a species of rodent in the family Muridae.
It is found only in Central African Republic, around the Gounda River.
Its natural habitat is moist savanna.

References

Mus (rodent)
Endemic fauna of the Central African Republic
Mammals described in 1970
Taxonomy articles created by Polbot